The Iowa Commission for the Blind Building is an historic building located in downtown Des Moines, Iowa. The building is a steel-framed structure covered in brick.

History 
The building was completed in 1913 for use by the YMCA. It was designed by the Des Moines architectural firm of Proudfoot, Bird & Rawson in the Neoclassical style. When the YMCA moved to their present location in 1959, the state acquired the building for the Iowa Commission for the Blind. It was here that the commission, under the direction of Dr. Kenneth Jernigan transformed rehabilitation services for the blind in the state into what became known as the Iowa Model. It is based on the belief that with the proper training and opportunity, the blind can live productive and successful lives. The building was listed on the National Register of Historic Places in 2000.

References

Buildings and structures completed in 1913
Office buildings in Des Moines, Iowa
National Register of Historic Places in Des Moines, Iowa
Government buildings on the National Register of Historic Places in Iowa
Neoclassical architecture in Iowa